Alain Goldmann (14 September 1931 – 4 September 2022) was a French rabbi.

Biography
Goldmann completed his rabbinical studies at the Israelite Seminary of France. From 1981 to 1994, he was Chief Rabbi of Paris.

He represented the French rabbinate at the Comité consultatif national d'éthique and at the Conference of European Rabbis. In 2009, he became a member of the Commission nationale consultative des droits de l'homme, where he co-signed a minority opinion against same-sex marriage in Switzerland.

Alain Goldmann died in Paris on 4 September 2022, at the age of 90.

Decorations
Grand Officer of the Legion of Honour (2012)

References

1931 births
2022 deaths
20th-century French rabbis
21st-century French rabbis
Chief rabbis of France
Rabbis from Paris
Grand Officiers of the Légion d'honneur
People from Strasbourg